The 1950 season was Wisła Krakóws 42nd year as a club. Wisła was under the name of Gwardia Kraków.

Friendlies

Ekstraklasa

Squad, appearances and goals

|-
|}

Goalscorers

Disciplinary record

External links
1950 Wisła Kraków season at historiawisly.pl

Wisła Kraków seasons
Association football clubs 1950 season
Wisla